"You've Really Got a Hold on Me" is a song written by Smokey Robinson, which became a 1962 Top 10 hit single for the Miracles. One of the Miracles' most covered tunes, this million-selling song received a 1998 Grammy Hall of Fame Award. It has also been selected as one of The Rock and Roll Hall of Fame's 500 Songs that Shaped Rock and Roll. It was recorded by the Beatles for their second album, With the Beatles (1963). Many other musicians also recorded versions.

Composition and recording
"You've Really Got a Hold On Me" was written by Smokey Robinson while in New York in 1962 on business for Motown; he heard Sam Cooke's "Bring It On Home to Me", which was in the charts at the time, and—influenced by it—wrote the song in his hotel room.

The song was recorded in Motown's Studio A on October 16, 1962, with Robinson on lead vocals, and Miracles' second tenor Bobby Rogers on harmony co-lead. Robinson was the producer, and he had Eddie Willis and Miracle Marv Tarplin share the guitar parts.

Originally a "B" Side
The song was released on the Tamla label on November 9, 1962, as the B side of "Happy Landing".  "Happy Landing" reached some regional charts; however, "Hold On Me" ultimately performed better.  With "You've Really Got a Hold on Me" as the A side, the single reached the Top 10 on the Billboard Hot 100 Pop chart, peaking at number eight, and was a number one smash on the Billboard R&B singles chart during the winter of 1962–63.  Cash Box described it as "a pulsating beat-ballad romancer that the artists carve out in emotion-packed fashion" and said "could be a real big dual-mart, pop-r&b sales item."  Cash Box also praised the "captivating instrumental assist."

The Miracles' original version was inducted into the Grammy Hall of Fame in 1998. It was also the group's second single to sell over a million copies, after "Shop Around".  The song was included on the album The Fabulous Miracles over three months after its release.

Personnel
The Miracles
Smokey Robinson – lead vocal
Claudette Rogers Robinson – backing vocal
Pete Moore – backing vocal
Ronnie White – backing vocal
Bobby Rogers – co-lead vocal and backing vocal
Marv Tarplin – guitar
Other instruments by the Funk Brothers

The Beatles rendition

"You Really Got a Hold on Me" was the first song recorded for the Beatles' second British album, With the Beatles, and was included on their third US album, The Beatles' Second Album.  It features John Lennon and George Harrison on lead vocals with Paul McCartney on harmony vocals.

The Beatles recorded the song on July 18, 1963. This session took place while Please Please Me was still at number one in the album charts four months after its release, and in the midst of a rigorous touring schedule that also had to include BBC sessions for radio and television. It was completed in seven takes, four of which were complete. The group then recorded four edit pieces. The final version was an edit of takes 7, 10 and 11.

The Beatles also recorded "You Really Got a Hold on Me" on four occasions for BBC radio in 1963. One of these, from July 30, 1963 was included on the Live at the BBC collection. A live version recorded in Stockholm, Sweden, in October 1963 was released in 1995 on Anthology 1. The song was performed once again in 1969, during the Let It Be recording sessions, and featured in the 1970 documentary film, Let It Be.

Personnel
John Lennon – rhythm guitar, lead vocals
George Harrison – lead guitar, lead vocals
Paul McCartney – bass guitar, harmony vocals
Ringo Starr – drums
George Martin – piano

Other versions
"You've Really Got a Hold on Me" has been recorded several times since its release. A rendition by Eddie Money, recorded for his self-titled debut album, reached number 72 on the U.S. Billboard Hot 100 in December 1978, and number 68 in Canada in January 1979.

A version by American country music artist Mickey Gilley peaked at number two on the U.S. Billboard Hot Country Songs chart and number one on the Canadian RPM Country Tracks chart.

References

The Miracles songs
Songs written by Smokey Robinson
Tamla Records singles
Parlophone singles
1962 singles
1963 singles
1979 singles
1980 singles
1983 singles
The Beatles songs
Eddie Money songs
Mickey Gilley songs
Song recordings produced by George Martin
Song recordings produced by Jim Ed Norman
Grammy Hall of Fame Award recipients
RPM Top Singles number-one singles
Epic Records singles
Song recordings produced by Berry Gordy
Song recordings produced by Smokey Robinson
1962 songs
1960s ballads
Soul ballads

ja:ユーヴ・リアリー・ゴッタ・ホールド・オン・ミー#ビートルズによるカバー